Dargida tetera is a species of cutworm or dart moth in the family Noctuidae.

The MONA or Hodges number for Dargida tetera is 10433.

References

Further reading

 
 
 

Hadenini
Articles created by Qbugbot
Moths described in 1902